Mission Lake, also known as Lebret Lake, is a lake in the Canadian province of Saskatchewan. It is one of four lakes in the Qu'Appelle Valley known as the Fishing Lakes. Echo Lake is upstream and Katepwa Lake is downstream. The lake was named Mission after the Catholic mission at Lebret. Highways 22 35, and 56 provide access to the lake.

Mission Lake, as well as the other three Fishing Lakes, are all in the deep-cut Qu'Appelle Valley, which was formed about 14,000 years ago during the last ice age. Meltwater from the glaciers carved out the valley and as water levels rose and fell, alluvium was left in the wake. These piles of alluvium are what created the separations between the lakes.

The Qu'Appelle River is both the primary inflow and out flow. The river enters the lake at the west end, near the town of Fort Qu'Appelle, and exits the lake at the south-east end. Echo Creek is a small creek that rises to the south-west near McLean and enters the lake at the south-west corner.

Communities
Mission Lake is located in the RM of North Qu'Appelle No. 187. At the western end is the town of Fort Qu'Appelle, which sits between Mission and Echo Lakes. The village of Lebret and the adjoining Wa-pii-moos-toosis Indian Reserve are located on the northern shore along Highway 56. The Qu'Appelle Indian Residential School was located on the Wa-pii-moos-toosis Indian Reserve.

Recreation
Mission Ridge Winter Park is a ski resort located on the Qu'Appelle River valley wall near the south-west area of the lake. Syrian Beach is on the southern shore, near the east end and directly across the lake from Lebret.

The lake is also open to fishing and boating. The most commonly caught fish are walleye, perch, and pike.

Gallery

See also
List of lakes of Saskatchewan
Hudson Bay drainage basin

References

External links

Lakes of Saskatchewan
Division No. 6, Saskatchewan
North Qu'Appelle No. 187, Saskatchewan